Korea Cement Co, Ltd. (Hangul: 고려시멘트) is a South Korean cement and chemical company, headquartered in Sinan-dong Buk-gu Gwangju, Korea. established in 1962. It is a manufacturer of cement products, and is under the Gangdong Group family. The CEO of Korea Cement is Lee Kuk No (이국노).

Products
Portland cement
Slag cement

Manufacturing network (South Korea)
Jangseong
Gwangyang

Sponsored help companies
Hyundai Industry (Naju, Jeollanam-do)
Hyundai Remicon (Gokseong, Jeollanam-do)
Hyundai Holdings (Damyang, Jeollanam-do)
Hyundai Concrete (Goheung, Jeollanam-do)
Goheung Remicon (Goheung, Jeollanam-do)
Heunghan Remicon (Hadong, Gyeongsangnam-do)
Hyundai Industrial Development (Gwangsan-gu, Gwangju/Mokpo, Jeollanam-do)
Honam Ascon (Muan, Jeollanam-do)

See also
Eugene Group
Economy of South Korea

External links
Koryeo Cement Homepage 

Chemical companies of South Korea
Companies based in Gwangju
Chemical companies established in 1962
Gwangju
Eugene Group
Companies listed on the Korea Exchange